Freedom class may refer to:

 , a series of cruise ships operated by Royal Caribbean International
 , a series of United States Navy littoral combat ships